Anoeschka von Meck (born 1967) is a Namibian author who writes in the Afrikaans language.

Biography
Von Meck is of German and French Huguenot descent, the eldest of six siblings from a composite family. Their parents once being grape and cotton farmers in the Mariental-district, who then later settled in the coastal town of Henties Bay. In 1983 Von Meck relocated to California in the United States as a sixteen-year-old to finish high school there, graduating from Lynchburg Christian Academy in Virginia. She then first studied at Saddleback College and thereafter at Mission Viejo College, before enrolling for a degree in marine biology, comparative religions and child psychology at John F. Kennedy University in San Francisco. Whilst in the United States, Von Meck received the Golden Poet Award, awarded by the International Poetry Society.

Von Meck only returned to South Africa in her twenties and studied archaeology and religion at the University of Cape Town, making the Dean's Roll for top students. After achieving her bachelor's degree, Von Meck continued her studies at the University of Stellenbosch on invitation to join their Master's Degree Program in Egyptology at the Department for Ancient Near Eastern Studies. She also completed a diploma in Higher Education at the same institution. After trekking on foot through Zimbabwe, Von Meck innocently took a job working as a matron in a children's home in Robertson (which became the inspiration for her best seller, Vaselinetjie), having no idea what life at such an institution would entail.

From there Von Meck went on to become an award winning journalist, working first at Die Republikein in Namibia's capitol, Windhoek, also setting up and running the West Coast office of the Swartland & Weskus Herald. While living in Paternoster, Von Meck was in a physical confrontation with gangsters who attacked and beat her up while she was trying to protect elderly All Pay-recipients. She fought back so severely during the attack that the gangsters ended up making a case against her for assault. Von Meck would eventually end up working for Rapport, Cape Town.

Previously Von Meck had developed a bit of a cult following among some literary students for her debut novel, Annerkant die Longdrop (1997) (Eng. Beyond the Longdrop) with an unusual story where three characters turn out to be the dysfunctional mind of disturbed protagonist. While still at Die Republikein Von Meck's screen play, Rehoboth Pasta, won M-Net's annual New Directions competition seeking new script writers from countries south of the equator, thus getting to represent Namibia at an international workshop held in Zanzibar.

Next Von Meck wrote the runaway success, Vaselinetjie, which was published in 2004 and would go on to sell more than 100,000 copies and be reprinted more than 23 times. Vaselinetjie would also be cited as one of the best youth novels internationally, a rare achievement for a book not written in the English language. Locally in South Africa it won three literary awards: the Rapport/Jan Rabie Prize for fresh, new literary voices in Afrikaans, the MER Prize for Youth Literature, and the M-Net Prize for an Afrikaans text in short format. Vaselinetjie is a "true-life story on an abandoned child found lying next to railway lines at the coast and adopted by a coloured couple." The young protagonist gets her unusual name ("Vaseline") from her skin condition which the elderly couple that decides to raise her, try to heal with many ointments. Vaselinetjie's skin is ravished due to the fact that her young birthmother had left the newborn baby in a desolate and arid place, where insects were attracted to the wet body and afterbirth. When the baby was eventually found she was covered in ants with flies that had laid their eggs in her ears. Vaselinetjie was adapted for the stage multiple times and performed in Cape Town and various cultural festivals where young audiences went wild and would shout out dialogue from the book which they had memorized by heart. It also became one of the most popular prescribed school readers in South African schools for more than a decade. A film based on the novel and produced by Corné and René van Rooyen of Redletterday Pictures was released in 2017 and won Best Feature Film at the prestigious Silver Screen Awards in Camps Bay as well as Best Humanitarian Film at the Sedona International Film Festival in Arizona, USA.
In 2010 Von Meck published Die Ontwaking: Die lewe van Essie Honiball (Eng. The Awakening: The life of Essie Honiball), the biography of the mystical fruitarian who had achieved even international fame during her life time in alternative health circles. Von Meck had spend several months living with this unique and passionate environmental activist whilst completing the book on her extraordinary life.

As fate would have it, Von Meck happened to be the first journalist on the scene at the Rheenendal school bus tragedy which occurred on 24 August 2011 in which 14 primary school children lost their lives. All major newspapers in the country carried her photographs of the scene on their front pages the next day. Working for Group Editors in Knysna, Von Meck won the most competitive of all journalism categories in 2014, Best Hard News Reporter for community papers in South Africa.

In January 2015 Von Meck and a friend miraculously survived being caught between 5 runaway fires in a camp full of lions in the bush of the rugged North West Province. The wind unexplainably changed direction, creating a pathway between the roaring inferno, after people began praying for God's divine intervention in a seemingly hopeless scenario. The author still carries scars on her arms from the traumatic escape.

Nonetheless, Von Meck was up for the challenge once again in 2016 to travel by herself for 7 months through South Africa. This was a project for Afrikaans.com, conducting interviews in even the most far-off isolated settlements, whilst also collecting data for Viva Afrikaans on different Afrikaans dialects. In 2019 she set off once again, this time to realize Amanda Carstens of Christian Literature Fund's dream to research and write a book on the extensive impact of the second most severe drought in South Africa history. After traveling for approximately 12,300kms for 3 months in 16 different rainfall areas and personally visiting with 53 devastated farmers, Net voor die droogte my breek (Eng. Just before the drought breaks me), was published in 2020. "Coming from a farm, I thought I knew what I was getting myself into, but I will never be the same again after this experience. I salute the formidable spirit of survival which sets the South African 'boer' (farmer) apart from his fellow countrymen."

Von Meck achieved a Ph.D in Creative Writing (2019) from the University of Pretoria under the mentorship of Prof. Heinrich Willemse, receiving a special academic reward for unusual excellence in research. The external international examiner's report read "The dissertation makes an imperative contribution to Fat Fiction [...] and affirms solid research in this field." As a result the first Afrikaans novel in Fat Fiction, Die heelal op my tong (Eng. The universe on my tongue), was published in 2020 by PenguinRandomHouse. Die heelal op my tong received brilliant reviews and was shortlisted in 2012 for the University of Johannesburg book prize.

Selected works
Annerkant die Longdrop, 1998
Vaselinetjie, 2004 
Die Ontwaking: Die lewe van Essie Honiball, 2010 
 Net voor die droogte my breek, 2019
 Die heelal op my tong, 2020

References

1967 births
Living people
Namibian women writers
White Namibian people
Afrikaner people
Afrikaans-language writers
Saddleback College alumni
University of Cape Town alumni
Stellenbosch University alumni
People from Hardap Region
Namibian people of German descent
Namibian expatriates in South Africa
Namibian expatriates in the United States
20th-century women writers
20th-century Namibian women writers
21st-century Namibian women writers
20th-century Namibian writers
21st-century Namibian writers
Namibian journalists
Namibian women journalists